Franco Berni (born Alessandria, 9 January 1965) is a former Italian rugby union player. He played as lock.

Biography
A lock with a powerful body build (approximately 150 kg and 2m high), Berni started his rugby career in DLF Alessandria; then he moved to Alessandria in 1981-82, he was part of the squad that was promoted from Serie C to Serie B.

In 1982 he moved to ASR Milano and became almost then an under-17 international; he was also awarded by Gazzetta dello Sport as Serie A's best under-21.

In 1985, he debuted for Italy at Brașov, against Romania, and two years later, he was in the 1987 Rugby World Cup roster, where Berni took part only a match, against the All Blacks, which is also the first match in the history of the World Cup.
Moving to Amatori Milano, with such team, later known as Milan, won 4 scudetti and a Coppa Italia in the 1990s; later, at the CUS Genova, he was between the protagonists of the promotion from Serie B to Serie A2.

He was also invited several times in the Zebre, with which played several international matches.

He ended his playing career in Piacenza in 2000, where he started the coach career. Again in Alessandria until 2008, from 2008-09 season he coaches Settimo Torinese, to then move to coach the Genoan team "Zena Wasps Rugby".

He had also a politician career: in 1997 he was candidate for communal councillor in Alessandria for Forza Italia

Notes

External links

1965 births
Living people
People from Alessandria
Italian rugby union players
Italy international rugby union players
Italian rugby union coaches
Rugby union locks
Sportspeople from the Province of Alessandria